The girls' rhythmic group all-around at the 2014 Summer Youth Olympics was held on August 26–27 at the Nanjing Olympic Sports Centre.

Each group consists of five gymnasts who all perform in each routine. There are two rounds, one preliminary and one final, with each round consisting of two routines. In the preliminary, each group completes one routine using 5 hoops and one routine using 10 clubs. The four groups with the highest combined scores in the two routines advance to the final. There, they perform the two routines again. Scores from the preliminary will not be carried over, and the group starts back their routines with maximum of D10/E10 in base value.

Medalists

Qualification

Final

References
 Nanjing 2014 Group Qualification
 Nanjing 2014 Group Final

Gymnastics at the 2014 Summer Youth Olympics